The Story of Doctor Dolittle, Being the History of His Peculiar Life at Home and Astonishing Adventures in Foreign Parts (1920), written and illustrated by the British author Hugh Lofting, is the first of his Doctor Dolittle books, a series of children's novels about a man who learns to talk to animals and becomes their champion around the world. It was one of the novels in the series which was adapted into the 1967 film Doctor Dolittle.

Plot
John Dolittle, MD, is a respected physician and quiet bachelor living with his spinster sister Sarah in the small English village of Puddleby-on-the-Marsh. His love of animals grows over the years and his household menagerie eventually scares off his human clientele, leading to loss of wealth. But after learning the secret of speaking to all animals from his parrot Polynesia, he takes up veterinary practice.

His fortunes rise and fall again after a crocodile takes up residence, leading to his sister leaving in disgust with the intention of getting married, but his fame in the animal kingdom spreads throughout the world. He is conscripted into voyaging to Africa to cure a monkey epidemic just as he faces bankruptcy. He has to borrow supplies and a ship, and sails with a crew of his favourite animals, but is shipwrecked upon arriving to Africa. On the way to the monkey kingdom, his band is arrested by the king of Jolliginki, a victim of European exploitation who wants no white men travelling in his country.

The band barely escapes by ruse, but makes it to the monkey kingdom where things are dire indeed as a result of the raging epidemic. He vaccinates the well monkeys and nurses the sick back to health. In appreciation, the monkeys find the pushmi-pullyu, a shy two-headed gazelle-unicorn cross, whose rarity may bring Dr. Dolittle money back home.

On the return trip, they again are captured in Jolliginki. This time they escape with the help of Prince Bumpo, who gives them a ship in exchange for Dolittle's bleaching Bumpo's face white, his greatest desire being to act as a European fairy-tale prince. Dolittle's crew then have a couple of run-ins with pirates, leading to Dolittle's winning a pirate ship loaded with treasures and rescuing a boy whose uncle was abandoned on a rock island. After reuniting the two, Dolittle finally makes it home and tours with the pushmi-pullyu in a circus until he makes enough money to retire to his beloved home in Puddleby.

Publication
Although the book's author was British, it was published in the US by Frederick A. Stokes on October 25, 1920 before being published in the UK by Cape in 1924.

Racism
The book contains several racial slurs and a skin whitening subplot. Lofting's illustrations of Africans are also racist caricatures. When Dell Publishing issued Lofting centenary editions of the books in 1988, the slurs and colorist subplot were removed.

References

External links 
 
 
 
 
 The Story of Doctor Dolittle is also available in multiple e-book formats at eBookBees
 Hugh Lofting - First Editions - first editions shown with pictures of the books
 

1920 American novels
1920 children's books
1920 fantasy novels
American children's novels
Doctor Dolittle books
Novels about pirates
Novels set in Africa
American novels adapted into films
American children's books
American fantasy novels
Frederick A. Stokes Company books
Race-related controversies in literature
Self-censorship